Van Buren Township, Ohio may refer to:

Van Buren Township, Darke County, Ohio
Van Buren Township, Hancock County, Ohio
Van Buren Township, Putnam County, Ohio
Van Buren Township, Shelby County, Ohio

See also
Van Buren Township (disambiguation)

Ohio township disambiguation pages